Thedarrius "Theo" Jackson (born October 2, 1998) is an American football safety for the Minnesota Vikings of the National Football League (NFL). He played college football at Tennessee.

Early life
Jackson was born on October 2, 1998. He was raised in Brentwood, Tennessee. He played on youth teams coached by his father Nate Foster who formerly played college football for Western Kentucky.

High school career
Jackson played high school football at Overton where he earned several accolades during the 2016 season. He was rated a three-star recruit and top-25 prospect in Tennessee. On February 1, 2017, Jackson signed a letter of intent to the University of Tennessee.

College career
Jackson played five seasons (2017-2021) for the University of Tennessee, as a member of the Volunteers football team. He played under head coaches Butch Jones, Jeremy Pruitt, and Josh Heupel. He started 24 of 56 games and recorded 190 career tackles. He earned an undergraduate degree in communications. He earned Second team All-SEC honors for 2021.

Professional career

Tennessee Titans
Jackson was drafted by the Tennessee Titans in the sixth round, 204th overall, of the 2022 NFL Draft. He was waived on August 30, 2022, and signed to the practice squad the next day.

Minnesota Vikings
On October 11, 2022, Jackson was signed off the Titans' practice squad by the Minnesota Vikings, who were in need of safety depth after a season-ending injury to Lewis Cine.

References

External links

 Minnesota Vikings bio
 Tennessee Volunteers bio

1998 births
Living people
Players of American football from Nashville, Tennessee
American football safeties
American football cornerbacks
Tennessee Volunteers football players
Tennessee Titans players
Minnesota Vikings players